"Outta My Head" is a song by Australian alternative rock band, Spiderbait and was released in November 2001 as the second single from the band's fifth studio album The Flight of Wally Funk. "Outta My Head" peaked at number 89 on the Australian chart and ranked at number 71 on Triple J's Hottest 100 in 2001.

Track listings

Charts

Release history

References

 
2001 singles
2001 songs
Spiderbait songs
Song recordings produced by Magoo (Australian producer)
Universal Music Australia singles